Monom (Monam), not to be confused with Bonam (a Bahnar subgroup), is an Austro-Asiatic language of Vietnam. Speakers are officially classified by the Vietnamese government as Sedang people.

Monom is spoken mostly in Kon Plông District, Kon Tum Province (Le et al. 2014:175)

References

Languages of Vietnam
Bahnaric languages